Felix Fabri (also spelt Faber; 1441 – 1502) was a Swiss Dominican theologian. He left vivid and detailed descriptions of his pilgrimages to Palestine and also in 1489 authored a book on the history of Swabia, entitled Historia Suevorum.

He made his early studies under the Dominicans at Basle and Ulm, where he spent most of his life.

"Faber" is the Latin nominative singular form of his surname. He is often referred to as "Fabri," the Latin genitive singular, i.e. the possessive form, because his name appears this way in the title of his book, "Fratris Felicis Fabri Evagatorium in Terræ Sanctæ, Arabiæ et Egypti peregrinationem."

One of Fabri's companions during his 1483–84 pilgrimage to the Holy Land was Hungarian poet and cleric János Lászai.<ref>Lázár, Imre: Egy erdélyi zarándok Egyiptomban. Lászai János 1483-as útja a Szent Család nyomában. In: Magyar Egyháztörténeti Vázlatok, 2000. Vol. 1–4., 105–125. p.
</ref>

In Jerusalem he met Bernhard von Breidenbach.

A fictional account of Fabri's journey to and time in the Holy Land is found in the book A Stolen Tongue, by Sheri Holman.

References

Bibliography
Fabri, Felix (1848): Fratris Felicis Fabri Evagatorium in Terrae sanctae, Arabiae et Aegypti peregrinationem: 3 vol. in Latin. Vol 1. The full text, google-books,
Fabri, Felix (1849): Fratris Felicis Fabri Evagatorium in Terræ Sanctæ, Arabiæ et Egypti peregrinationem in Latin. Vol 3. The full text, google-books,

 with p. 677: Index
Jean Meyers, Félix Fabri. Les errances de Frère Félix, pélerin en Terre sainte, en Arabie et en Égypte (1480–1483). Tome I : Premier et deuxième traités. Montpellier : Publications de l'Université Paul-Valéry et du CERCAM, 2000, 438 p.Félix Fabri. Les errances de Frère Félix, pélerin en Terre sainte, en Arabie et en Égypte (1480–1483). Tome II : Troisième et quatrième traités. Texte Latin, introduction, traduction et notes sous la direction de Jean Meyers et Nicole Chareyron, Montpellier : Publications de l'Université Paul-Valéry et du CERCAM, 2003, 453 p.Pilgrimage Yesterday and Today'' (1988) J. G. Davies, SCM Press Ltd.

Swiss Dominicans
Holy Land travellers
Year of birth uncertain
1440s births
1502 deaths
Medieval Knights of the Holy Sepulchre